Wormwood (ἀψίνθιον apsinthion or ἄψινθος apsinthos in Greek) is a star or angel which appears in the Book of Revelation.

Hebrew Bible
The Biblical Hebrew word לענה (la'anah), translated into English as "wormwood", occurs eight times in the Hebrew Bible, always with the implication of bitterness.

New Testament
The Greek word apsinthos, which is rendered with the English "wormwood", is mentioned only once in the New Testament, in the Book of Revelation:

Apsinthos is believed to refer to a plant of the genus Artemisia, used metaphorically to mean something with a bitter taste. The English rendering "wormwood" refers to the dark green oil produced by the plant, which was used to kill intestinal worms. In the Book of Revelation, it refers to the water being turned into wormwood, i.e. made bitter.

Interpretations
Certain commentators have held that this "great star" represents one of several important figures in political or ecclesiastical history: Matthew Henry mentions Augustulus, a 5th-century emperor of the Western Roman Empire, and Pelagius, deemed a heretic at the Council of Ephesus. 

Other Bible dictionaries and commentaries view the term as a reference to a celestial being; for example, A Dictionary of the Holy Bible states that "the star called Wormwood seems to denote a mighty prince, or power of the air, the instrument, in its fall".

Historicist
Various religious groups and figures, including Seventh-day Adventists and the theologians Matthew Henry and John Gill, regard the verses of Revelation 8 as symbolic references to past events in human history. In the case of Wormwood, some historicist interpreters believe that this figure represents the army of the Huns as led by king Attila, pointing to chronological consistencies between the timeline of prophecy they have accepted and the history of the Huns' campaign in Europe. Others point to Arius, the emperor Constantine, Origen or the ascetic monk Pelagius, who denied the doctrine of original sin.

Spiritual
The Swedenborgian New Church follows a spiritual interpretation of the star Wormwood based on other passages of scripture which mention gall and wormwood. The star signifies self-derived intelligence which departs from God, thus it falls from heaven. For the star to make the waters of rivers and fountains bitter signifies to falsify spiritual truths, as waters signify truths derived from the Word. In general, the Book of Revelation is seen as a prophecy of the corruption of the Christian churches in the end times which is followed by a New Church, signified by the New Jerusalem.

Alternative interpretations
A number of Bible scholars consider the term Wormwood to be a purely symbolic representation of the bitterness that will fill the earth during troubled times, noting that the plant for which Wormwood is named, Artemisia absinthium, or Mugwort, Artemisia vulgaris, is a known biblical metaphor for things that are unpalatably bitter.

Chernobyl 
Due to the Ukrainian word for Artemisia vulgaris being chernobyl, many have used the Chernobyl nuclear disaster in 1986 as definitive proof that the prophecy in the Book of Revelation is correct. The verses referring to a "star falling down and turning the waters bitter" are interpreted as the radioactive fallout from the disaster poisoning the environment around Chernobyl, leaving it uninhabitable.

In the town centre of Chernobyl, there is the Wormwood Star Memorial, which depicts an angel blowing a trumpet, recalling the biblical prophecy.

See also
 List of angels in theology

References

External links
Revelation 8:11 The name of the star is called Wormwood

Angels in Christianity
Astronomical myths
Book of Proverbs
Book of Revelation
Individual angels
New Testament words and phrases
Prophecy in Christianity
Water and religion